Kushkecheh (also Romanized as Kūshkecheh; also known as Koshkīcheh, Kūshk-e Kūchak, and Kūshkgīcheh) is a village in Garkan Rural District, Garkan-e Jonubi District, Mobarakeh County, Isfahan Province, Iran. At the 2006 census, its population was 1,081, in 282 families.

References 

Populated places in Mobarakeh County